Teufelsberg (German for Devil's Mountain) is a non-natural hill in Berlin, Germany, in the Grunewald locality of former West Berlin. It was named after the Teufelssee (Devil's Lake) in its southerly vicinity. The hill is made of debris and rubble, and covers an unfinished Nazi military-technical college (Wehrtechnische Fakultät). During the Cold War, there was a U.S. listening station on the hill, Field Station Berlin. The site of the former field station is now fenced off and is currently being managed by an organisation which charges 5 to 10 euros for public access.

History

After the Communist putsch in the city parliament of Greater Berlin (for all four sectors of Berlin) in September 1948, separate parliaments and magistrates (city government) were formed for East and West Berlin. This also ended much of the cooperation between West Berlin and the state of Brandenburg, surrounding West Berlin in the North, West and South.

While part of the rubble from destroyed quarters in East Berlin was deposited outside the city boundary, all the debris from West Berlin had to be dumped within the western boundary. Due to the shortage of fuel in West Berlin, the rubble transport stopped during the Berlin Blockade.

Although there are many similar man-made rubble mounds in Germany (see Schuttberg) and other war-torn cities of Europe, Teufelsberg is unique in that the never completed Nazi military-technical college (Wehrtechnische Fakultät) designed by Albert Speer is buried beneath. The Allies tried using explosives to demolish the school, but it was so sturdy that covering it with debris turned out to be easier. In June 1950 the West Berlin Magistrate decided to open a new rubble disposal on that site.

With the end of material shortages after the blockade, an average of 600 trucks deposited  of material daily. On 14 November 1957, the ten millionth cubic metre arrived. The Senate of (West) Berlin  opted to plant greenery on the hill as a beautification project.

Müggelberge), and was the highest point in West Berlin.

In February 1955, a  ski jump opened on the hill, designed by the ski jumper and architect Heini Klopfer. A larger ski jump opened March 4, 1962, offering space for 5,000 spectators. Ski jumping ceased in 1969, allowing the ski jumps to fall into decay. The jumps were removed in 1999.

Teufelsberg has been a location for several recent movies and television programmes, such as The Gamblers, Berlin Station, Covert Affairs (second-season episode titled "Uberlin") and We Are the Night in which the finale takes place on Teufelsberg.

As in the whole of Grunewald Forest, wild boar frequently roam the hill.

Listening station: Field Station Berlin

The US National Security Agency (NSA) built one of its largest listening stations atop the hill in 1963, supposedly as part of the global ECHELON intelligence gathering network. "The Hill", as it was known colloquially by the many American soldiers who worked there around the clock and who commuted there from their quarters in the American Sector, was located in the British Sector. In July 1961, mobile Allied listening units began operations on Teufelsberg, having surveyed various other locales throughout West Berlin in a search for the best vantage point for listening to Soviet, East German, and other Warsaw Pact nations’ military traffic. They found that operations from atop Teufelsberg offered a marked improvement in listening ability.  This discovery eventually led to a large structure being built atop the hill, which would come to be run by the NSA (National Security Agency). Construction of a permanent facility was begun in October 1963. At the request of the US government, the ski lifts were removed because they allegedly disturbed the signals. The station continued to operate until the fall of East Germany and the Berlin Wall, but after that the station was closed and the equipment removed.  The buildings and antenna radomes still remain in place.

During the NSA operations some other curious things happened: It was noticed that during certain seasons the reception of radio signals was better than during the rest of the year. The 'culprit' was found after a while: it was the Ferris wheel of the annual German-American Volksfest Festival on the Hüttenweg in Zehlendorf. From then on, the Ferris wheel was left standing for some time after the festival was over. While there were rumors that the Americans had excavated a shaft down into the ruins beneath, that was never proven, and was likely based on reports that those who maintained equipment in one of the first enclosed antenna structures accessed the upper levels of the inflated dome via an airlock that led to a "tunnel" that was embedded in the structure's central column.  Speculation as to what might have existed within the highly restricted area frequently gave rise to rather elaborate but false rumors; one theory stated that "the tunnel" was an underground escape route, another that it housed a submarine base.

In the 1990s, as Berlin experienced an economic boom after German reunification, a group of investors bought the former listening station area from the City of Berlin with the intention to build hotels and apartments. There was talk of preserving the listening station as a spy museum. Berlin's building boom produced a glut of buildings, however, and the Teufelsberg project became unprofitable. The construction project was then aborted.  As of the early 2000s, there has been talk of the city buying back the hill. However, this is unlikely, as the area is encumbered with a mortgage of nearly 50 million dollars. The site has been heavily covered in graffiti since the company abandoned the project. Since 1996, the site has been privately owned and is currently fenced off from the surrounding forest. In the summer of 2016, landlord Marvin Schutte opened the site to visitors who are able to climb the listening station towers and admire the ever-evolving "street art gallery" that fills the site's abandoned buildings.  The site and buildings have uneven surfaces, broken glass, and building debris.  Accessing the main dome involves ascending a pitch dark stairwell in the centre of the building.  As of April 2017, entry to the site is €8 payable at the main entrance gate and a sign informs visitors that it is open from 10am to "one hour before sunset."

Following the announcement of plans to raze the facility and reforest the hill, talk of preserving the facility resurfaced in 2009, spearheaded by the Field Station Berlin Veterans Group, which hopes to have the memorial named in honor of Major Arthur D. Nicholson, the last military Cold War casualty, the U.S. Military Liaison Mission tour officer who was shot and killed by a Russian sentry near Ludwigslust on March 24, 1985. After no further construction was done after 2004, in 2006 the hilltop was categorised as forest in the land use plan of Berlin, thereby eliminating the possibility of building.

In September 2013, U.S. Army Teufelsberg veterans marked the fiftieth anniversary (1963-2013) of the construction of the permanent buildings for Field Station Berlin atop Teufelsberg with a special commemorative issue of Cinderella stamps, and with the dedication of a commemorative plaque. The designer is T. H. E. Hill, the award-winning author of two novels about Field Station Berlin.

Gallery

In popular culture

Art
 Hito Steyerl's "Factory of the Sun" and "The Identity Factory" both feature the location as an integral part of the respective works.

Memoirs
 C Trick: Sort of a Memoir, a memoir by Don Cooper (2000). Republished and expanded in 2003 in soft-cover as Worth the Trip. Re-republished as C Trick in 2010 with a prologue, new epilogue, and four new chapters. An ASA German linguist at Field Station Berlin in the mid-1960s.
 From Pin Stripes to Army Stripes by Sergeant Michael Riles, a memoir of experiences in occupied Germany from 1977-1981.
 The United States Garrison Berlin 1945-1994 by William Durie, 2014. .
 Berlin Daze - Tales of The Cold War on the Island of Freedom by C. Eric Estberg, 2018. .

Novels
By insiders
 Death On Devil's Mountain by David Von Norden (2009). ASA on Teufelsberg at Field Station Berlin in the late 1960s.
 McCurry's War by Chuck Thompson (2012): Field Station Berlin atop Teufelsberg in the 1960s. A closer look at the escapades of the soldiers of Teufelsberg with a little bit of humor mixed in that only the Army could provide.
 Voices Under Berlin: The Tale of a Monterey Mary by T.H.E. Hill (2008): An ASA Russian linguist in Berlin ostensibly in the mid-1950s, but closer in reality to the Field Station in the mid-1970s.
 Reunification: A Monterey Mary Returns to Berlin by T.H.E. Hill (2013): A comparison of Berlin in the 1970s with Berlin in the 2010s, spiced up with the stories of escapades that only ASA-ers at the Field Station could have pulled off.

By outsiders
 The Wall by John Marks (1999): an officer at the Field Station defects to the East just hours before the Wall falls; an outsider’s view of Field Station Berlin.

Audio
 Devil's Mountain by the Walrus & Bear podcast
 Cold War Linguists: The NSA's Spies of Teufelsberg (interviews with former workers)

Video
 

Music videos
 "Lost Faith" by Bob Mould, a music video in which the listening station is featured as a backdrop
 "A Million Stars" by the Australian band The Faim was recorded in the station in 2018.

Television
 The Same Sky, a 2017 series set in 1974, where several characters work at the listening station
 Berlin Station, a 2016 series set in the modern-day CIA Berlin Station

Film
 Manifesto, a 2015 multi-screen film installation by Julian Rosefeldt, features a scene at the station, involving a homeless man reciting various Situationist manifestos.

Video Games
 Call of Duty: Black Ops Cold War, a 2020 first-person shooter video game, features Teufelsberg, and the listening station, as the multiplayer map Echelon.

See also
 Teuflesberg (horse), American thoroughbred racehorse named after the Berlin landmark

References
Notes

Bibliography
 Derksen, David; Harseke-Diesling, Robert; Leitner, Florian; and Beckmann, Katharina (2013) Field Station Berlin Berlin: Berliner Unterwelten : in German
 
 Juttemann, Andreas and Nehling, Klaus (2011) Der Berliner Teufelsberg Berlin: Alles über Berlin GmbH : in German
 Wunsch, Chris (2016) Teufelsberg. A Berlin Ruinology Berlin: Vergangenheitsverlag : in English

External links

 Official Teufelsberg website and guided tours - Tours ceased on 01/09/15
 Teufelsberg Field Station Berlin
 Panorama pictures of Teufelsberg
 Pictures of Teufelsberg in April 2004
 Pictures of Teufelsberg in October 2008
 NSA Field Station Teufelsberg – a late post mortem
 Save Teufelsberg!
 West Alliierte in Berlin e.V. / Save Teufelsberg!
 Inside a radar dome at Listening Post Teufelsberg
 The acoustics of the radar dome at Teufelsberg
 Gallery of Teufelsberg in March 2015
 Audio Impulse Responses of 6 different locations inside Teufelsberg (Free)

Hills of Berlin
Charlottenburg-Wilmersdorf
Artificial hills
Espionage
Public art in Germany
Mass surveillance